Sinomegoura citricola, is an aphid in the superfamily Aphidoidea in the order Hemiptera. It is a pest found on citruses and other ornamental plants.

References
 http://aphid.aphidnet.org/Sinomegoura_citricola.php
 http://animaldiversity.org/accounts/Sinomegoura_citricola/classification/
 http://aphid.speciesfile.org/Common/basic/Taxa.aspx?TaxonNameID=7123
 http://www.forestryimages.org/browse/subthumb.cfm?sub=17553

Macrosiphini
Agricultural pest insects
Citrus pests
Ornamental plant pathogens and diseases
Insects described in 1917